The Tashkent Open by Zeromax is a women's tennis tournament held in Tashkent, Uzbekistan. Held since 1999, this WTA Tour event is an International tournament and is played on outdoor hard courts.

Since 2014, the event has been scheduled in early autumn, during the same week as Wuhan Open. In 2020 the tournament was replaced by WTA Lyon Open.

Past finals

Women's singles

Women's doubles

See also
List of tennis tournaments
ATP Tashkent Open – Men's tennis tournament

References

External links
Official Website
WTA Tournament Profile

 
Hard court tennis tournaments
Tennis tournaments in Uzbekistan
WTA Tour
Recurring sporting events established in 1999
1999 establishments in Uzbekistan
Sport in Tashkent